The National Council of European Resistance (officially abbreviated as CNRE) is a France-based pan-European far-right political organization co-founded by Renaud Camus and Karim Ouchikh on  by analogy to the National Council of the Resistance. It has links to the identitarian movement.

The Council is intended to bring together qualified French and European personalities who aspire to "work for the defence of European civilization"—to oppose the Great Replacement, immigration to Europe, and, more generally, to defeat replacist totalitarianism, a concept theorized by Renaud Camus.

Membership in the Council is strictly enlarged by co-option. Several high-ranking European officials have taken part, such as former President of the Czech Republic Václav Klaus, former members of the European Parliament Jean-Yves Le Gallou and Paul-Marie Coûteaux, former member of the European Parliament Janice Atkinson, former representative to the National Assembly of France Christian Vanneste, Belgian member of parliament Filip Dewinter, or Africanist historian Bernard Lugan.

Name 
The name Conseil national de la résistance européenne is a reference to the coordinating body of the French Resistance during the German occupation of France—the National Council of the Resistance. When asked how the CNRE could be both national and European, Renaud Camus replied:

History

Background 
Renaud Camus, a French writer and co-founder of the movement, coined in 2010–2011 the concept of "Great Replacement", a theory which supposes that "replacist elites" are colluding against the White French and Europeans in order to replace them with non-European peoples—specifically Muslim populations from Africa and the Middle East—through mass migration, demographic growth and a drop in the European birth rate; a process he labeled "genocide by substitution." Camus was a candidate in the 2012 French presidential election, but failed to gain enough elected representatives presentations to be able to run for president, and eventually decided to support Marine Le Pen.

Creation 
On 9 November 2017, in a public address in Colombey-les-Deux-Églises—the village where Charles de Gaulle is buried—Renaud Camus announced the foundation of the National Council of European Resistance and asked for a collective European commitment.

Membership

Council 
According to its official website, members of the CNRE include:

Public membership 

 is a legal association created concurrently with the Council under the French law of 1901. Its purpose is to welcome natural persons and legal entities of French or foreign nationality, who wish to actively support the action of the CNRE, by relaying its ideas, through militant actions or through financial contributions.

References

Footnotes

Citations

Bibliography

External links 
 List of members of the National Council of European Resistance  
 Constitutional charter of the National Council of European Resistance  

2017 establishments in France
Anti-Islam sentiment in Europe
Anti-immigration politics in Europe
Cross-European advocacy groups
European migrant crisis
Identitarian movement
Identity politics
International organizations based in France
International political organizations
Opposition to antisemitism in Europe
Pan-European nationalism
Political advocacy groups in France
Political organizations based in Europe
Political organizations based in France
Social movements in Europe
Social movements in France